Greencastle Township is a township in Marshall County, Iowa, USA.

History
Greencastle Township was organized in 1856.

References

Townships in Marshall County, Iowa
Townships in Iowa